The 1972 Qatari coup d'état was a bloodless palace coup that took place in Qatar on 22 February 1972. The coup was carried out by then heir apparent and Prime Minister Khalifa bin Hamad Al Thani, who took control of the country while his cousin, Emir Ahmad bin Ali Al Thani, was on a visit to Iran.

While many Western news outlets referred to the event as a coup, the Qatari population merely considered it to be a succession of power.

Aftermath
The initial activity of the new Emir was the process of the reorganization of the government. The process saw a dramatic shift in the hierarchy of authority. Khalifa bin Hamad immensely reduced the traditional powers afforded to the heir apparent while projecting all of the power onto himself. He appointed Suhaim bin Hamad Al Thani as Minister of Foreign Affairs; he also appointed an adviser to himself regarding the day-to-day affairs. Furthermore, he limited the financial privileges of members of the ruling Al Thani family.

After his deposition, the former Emir lived in exile in Dubai, United Arab Emirates and chose to remain in exile until his death in 1977.

See also
 1995 Qatari coup d'état

References

Conflicts in 1972
Coup d'etat, 1972
coup d'etat
Qatar
Military history of Qatar
Military coups in Qatar
February 1972 events in Asia